Minnesota State Highway 22 (MN 22) is a  highway in south-central and central Minnesota, which runs from Winnebago County Road R50 at the Iowa state line near Kiester and continues north to its northern terminus at its intersection with State Highway 23 in Richmond, west of St. Cloud.

Route description

State Highway 22 serves as a north–south route between Wells, Mankato, St. Peter, Gaylord, Glencoe, Hutchinson, Litchfield, and Richmond.

Highway 22 parallels State Highway 15 throughout its route.  Highway 22 also intersects with Highway 15 at Hutchinson.

The route crosses the Minnesota River between St. Peter and Kasota.

Highway 22 is built as a four-lane divided highway on the east side of Mankato.

The southern terminus for Highway 22 is at the Iowa state line, near Kiester, where Highway 22 becomes Winnebago County Road R50 (140th Avenue) upon crossing the state line.

History
State Highway 22 was authorized in 1920 from St. Peter to Paynesville. In 1934, it was extended south to the Iowa state line, and its northernmost section between Eden Valley and Paynesville became part of State Highway 55.

The section of Highway 22 between Mankato and St. Peter follows the original route of U.S. Highway 169.  When the parallel route west of the Minnesota River was first completed in the late 1950s, it originally carried the Highway 22 designation for a few years until it was redesignated U.S. 169 and Highway 22 reverted to its original alignment.

From 1934 to 1961, the northern terminus for Highway 22 was at its intersection with State Highway 55 in Eden Valley.  The Highway 22 designation was extended north to Richmond in 1961. Highway 22 will be redone from Mapleton to CO RD 90 just south of Mankato starting March 27, 2017, with the project finalizing in 2019.  It will be a 3 part project, with the first stage being Mapleton to Beauford in 2017.  In 2018 from Beauford to CO RD 90.  Finally in 2019 the Victory Drive Memorial will be finished.

Highway 22 was paved in its entirety by 1953.

The new alignment section of Highway 22 on the southeast side of Mankato to U.S. Highway 14 was constructed .

Major intersections

References

022
Transportation in Stearns County, Minnesota
Transportation in Meeker County, Minnesota
Transportation in McLeod County, Minnesota
Transportation in Sibley County, Minnesota
Transportation in Nicollet County, Minnesota
Transportation in Blue Earth County, Minnesota
Transportation in Le Sueur County, Minnesota
Transportation in Faribault County, Minnesota
U.S. Route 169